The Birdville Center of Technology and Advanced Learning (BCTAL) is a magnet school in the Birdville Independent School District, located in North Richland Hills, Texas. BCTAL offers students of Haltom High School, Richland High School, and Birdville High School courses in career and technology.

Campus
The Birdville Center of Technology and Advanced Learning is located in a central location relative to its three feeder schools. It was built in 2008-2009 and officially opened to students in 2009. It was designed to provide more space for the career and technology programs to centralize most of the district's programs in one location.

Programs
Programs at the campus include Media Technology, Agricultural, Pre Medical, Animal Science, Cosmetology, Automotive Technology, Construction Technology, Culinary Arts, Criminal Justice, Travel/Tourism and many others.

References

Magnet schools in Texas
Public high schools in Texas
North Richland Hills, Texas